"I Can Hardly Wait" is a 1943 short subject directed by Jules White starring American slapstick comedy team The Three Stooges (Moe Howard, Larry Fine and Curly Howard). It is the 73rd entry in the series released by Columbia Pictures starring the comedians, who released 190 shorts for the studio between 1934 and 1959.

Plot
The Stooges are defense workers at the Heedlock Airplane Corp., a pun on the Lockheed Aircraft Corporation.  In the opening scene, they enter an apartment and break into a safe, which turns out to be a refrigerator.  With the food they find, they prepare a late night meal of a single slice of ham, an egg, bread and coffee.  Moe and Larry share the food, and Curly gets the bone and the eggshell. While eating, Curly breaks his tooth while attempting to eat the ham bone, resulting in a major toothache. Moe suggests he simply gets some sleep, and in the morning the toothache will be gone.

The boys situate themselves for bed in a three-tiered bunk bed. Curly naturally receives the top bunk and his ascent thereto is not without mishap: faces are stepped on, and an attempt to alleviate Curly's pain using a hot water bottle ends in a soaking for Moe. When Curly does finally fall asleep, we are introduced into his dreams where his persistent moaning and complaining about his toothache aggravate the other two into action. His fear of dentists leaves the Stooges to improvise their own brand of home dentistry techniques. These techniques include trying to extract the tooth with a fishing pole and line, tying the tooth to the doorknob and violently closing it, tying the tooth to a ceiling light fixture and jumping from a ladder, and lastly, a firecracker.

As the dream sequence continues, Curly is taken by Moe to the dentist, Dr. Tug (Lew Davis). A terrified and belligerent Curly makes the check-up difficult. Exhausted from wrestling with Curly, Dr. Tug enters the adjoining office of his partner Dr. Yank (Bud Jamison) and asks him to complete the extraction. Meanwhile, Moe tries to placate Curly's fears by taking his place in the chair and simulating the procedure. Yank enters the office and—believing Moe to be the patient—knocks him out with ether in a rag and pulls his tooth, ignoring Curly's warnings. Yank hands the extracted tooth to Curly and, upon learning that Curly is the real patient, runs out of the room. Moe awakens and finds Curly holding the tooth. This understandably angers him to no end and he takes it out on Curly, who attempts to defend himself. This flailing action in the dream translates to similar action in his sleep, causing him to wake up and fall through the entire bunk bed, which collapses in a heap on top of his two sleeping compatriots. Enraged, Moe gives Curly a solid punch to the jaw. This dislodges the problem tooth and all is well. The boys fall asleep where they lie amongst the bed cushions and splintered wood.

Production notes
"I Can Hardly Wait" was filmed on March 15–18, 1943. It is a remake of the 1928 Laurel and Hardy silent short film Leave 'Em Laughing. The film title is officially listed with quotation marks (as "I Can Hardly Wait"), as it represents a phrase Curly repeats throughout the film. The first two malapropistic lines of Curly’s song ("She was bred (bread) in Old Kentucky/But She's only a crumb up here") is also the name of the song the Stooges performed as “Nill, Null, and Void” in the film Loco Boy Makes Good.

As "I Can Hardly Wait" was filmed during World War II, it contains references to wartime activities and propaganda, such as the Stooges working on fighter planes as defense workers and Moe’s reasoning for the dentist to have Curly’s broken tooth removed: “Listen, doc, we're defense workers. If you wanna cut down on absenteeism, yank this guy’s tooth! He won’t let us sleep, he’s sabotaging the war effort!”

References

External links 
 
 
"I Can Hardly Wait" at threestooges.net

1943 films
The Three Stooges films
American black-and-white films
Films directed by Jules White
Films about dreams
1943 comedy films
Columbia Pictures short films
American comedy short films
1940s English-language films
1940s American films